Herbert McWilliams (11 June 1907 – 11 February 1995) was a South African sailor. He competed in the Firefly event at the 1948 Summer Olympics.

References

External links
 

1907 births
1995 deaths
South African male sailors (sport)
Olympic sailors of South Africa
Sailors at the 1948 Summer Olympics – Firefly
Sportspeople from Port Elizabeth